The Dust of Naples is a 1998 Italian comedy film written and directed by Antonio Capuano.

Cast 

 Silvio Orlando: Ciriaco - Ciarli
 Tonino Taiuti: Gerri
 Lola Pagnani: Rosita
 Teresa Saponangelo: Teresa 
 Antonino Iuorio: Bibberò
 Gigio Morra: Bilancione
 Giovanni Esposito: Mimmo

References

External links

1998 films
Italian comedy films
1998 comedy films
Films directed by Antonio Capuano
1990s Italian-language films
Films with screenplays by Paolo Sorrentino
1990s Italian films